The 1996 San Jose Clash season was the first season of the team's existence. The team won the inaugural MLS game against D.C. United.

Squad

Current squad

Competitions

Major League Soccer

Standings

Western Conference

Overall Table

Results by round

Matches 

(SO) = Shootout

MLS Cup Playoffs

Western Conference semifinals

Source:

References

External links

San Jose Earthquakes season stats | sjearthquakes.com
San Jose Earthquakes Game Results | Soccerstats.us
San Jose Earthquakes 100 Greatest Goals 1996 | Youtube

1996
San Jose Clash
San Jose Clash
San Jose Clash